Frank E. Lawson (born August 9, 1868, in Delavan, Wisconsin) was a member of the Wisconsin State Assembly. Lawson was elected to the Assembly in 1922, 1924 and 1926. Additionally, he was Town Clerk of Walworth (town), Wisconsin and President of the Village Board (similar to city council) of Walworth, Wisconsin. He was a Republican.

References

People from Delavan, Wisconsin
Wisconsin city council members
City and town clerks
1868 births
Year of death missing
People from Walworth, Wisconsin
Republican Party members of the Wisconsin State Assembly